Waltz in Marathon is a 1983 fiction novel written by Charles Dickinson, about a loan shark whose life is changed by the return of his grown children and an old romance.

Plot summary 
Gentleman loan shark Harry Waltz, a sixty-one-year-old resident of Marathon, Michigan, finds his life dramatically altered by the return of his grown children and his romance with Mary Hale, a successful, forty-year-old lawyer.

Reception 
Waltz in Marathon received positive reviews from critics.  Ruth Doan MacDougall of The Christian Science Monitor wrote that "This is a startling first novel, mature and professional, abounding with good spirits."  Kirkus Reviews stated that "this is uncommonly satisfying fiction--with bright, intimately etched scenes, Dickinson's self-assured style (quiet, artful). . . and, above all, characters of quality and qualities."

Cover Art 
The artwork for this book was done by famed illustrator and children's book author Fred Marcellino.

References

External links 
 Official Website

1983 American novels
American romance novels